Dąbrowa Bolesławiecka  is a village in the administrative district of Gmina Bolesławiec, within Bolesławiec County, Lower Silesian Voivodeship, in south-western Poland.

The village has a population of 700.

History
The village was mentioned as Dambrowa in a document from 1305, when it was part of fragmented Piast-ruled Poland.

During World War II, the Germans operated a forced labour subcamp of the Stalag VIII-B/344 prisoner-of-war camp in the village.

Transport
The Polish A4 motorway and Voivodeship road 297 run through the village, and the A18 motorway runs nearby, northeast of the village.

References

Villages in Bolesławiec County